Shield of Solomon is a documentary by Igal Hecht about the story of four War in Darfur refugees who have found sanctuary in the Jewish state of Israel.

Summary
Since April 2007 more than three thousand Darfur and South Sudanese refugees have crossed the Egyptian border into Israel. If caught at the border by the Egyptian military the refugees are either tortured, jailed, or killed. Caught off guard, Israel faced a moral dilemma. Israel and Sudan are still officially considered enemies and the Sudanese government has stated publicly that any refugee who has entered Israel will be killed if returned to Sudan.

Film festivals
San Diego Jewish Film Festival  - February 2009
Rhode Island International Film Festival - August 2008

References

External links
Official website
The Canadian Jewish News - Movie review

Israeli documentary films
Documentary films about refugees
Documentary films about the War in Darfur